Jinshan Temple, may refer to the following Buddhist temples in China:

 Jinshan Temple (Zhenjiang), in Zhenjiang, Jiangsu
 Jinshan Temple (Wenzhou), in Wenzhou, Zhejiang
 Jinshan Temple (Chengmai County), in Chengmai County, Hainan
 Jinshan Temple (Kaijiang County), in Kaijiang County, Sichuan
 Jinshan Temple (Ziyang), in Ziyang, Sichuan
 Jinshan Temple (Fujian), in Fuzhou, Fujian
 Jinshan Temple (Fuzhou), in Linchuan District of Fuzhou, Jiangxi
 Jinshan Temple (Jinchang), in Jinchang, Gansu
 Jinshan Temple (Mengzhou), in Mengzhou, Henan
 Jinshan Temple (Hebi), in Hebi, Henan
 Jinshan Temple, a Chinese opera based on the Legend of the White Snake, related to the temple in Zhenjiang